Johann of Brandenburg-Ansbach (9 January 1493 in Plassenburg – 5 July 1525 in Valencia) was the second husband of Germaine de Foix and viceroy of Valencia from 1523 until his death in 1525.

Biography
He was a son of Frederick I, Margrave of Brandenburg-Ansbach and his wife Sophia of Poland.

He married on 17 June 1519 with Germaine de Foix (1490–1538), second wife and widow of King Ferdinand II of Aragon. In 1523 the couple was appointed Viceroys of Valencia by King Ferdinand's grandson Charles V, Holy Roman Emperor.

The marriage remained childless. After his death Germaine of Foix remarried Ferdinand of Aragón, Duke of Calabria.

Johann of Brandenburg-Ansbach became in 1516 a knight in the Order of the Golden Fleece.

House of Hohenzollern
1493 births
1525 deaths
Knights of the Golden Fleece
Sons of monarchs